Vineet Bajpai is an Indian entrepreneur and author. He is the Founder and CEO of Talentrack, an online platform for hiring and talent crowd sourcing for the media and entertainment sector. He is also the Founder and CEO of Magnon\TBWA, Magnon eg+ and Magnon Sancus. Magnon is part of the Fortune 500 Omnicom Group. In April 2020, Magnon was ranked as India's Fastest-Growing Digital Agency by Agency Reporter magazine. Bajpai is the author of eight books: Build From Scratch, The Street to the Highway, The 30 Something CEO, Harappa: Curse of the Blood River, Pralay: The Great Deluge, Kashi: Secret of the Black Temple, Mastaan: The Fallen Patriot of Delhi and 1857: The Sword of Mastaan.

Early life and education 

He gained an Honours degree in Economics (1997) from Hansraj College, Delhi University and his Post Graduate Diploma in Business Management (MBA, 1999) from Lal Bahadur Shastri Institute of Management, New Delhi.

Career 
Bajpai began his career with General Electric (GE Capital International Services) where he worked for less than a year, before starting his own business venture. In June 2000, he began his first company, Magnon Solutions, in a small shed. By 2012 Magnon had become one of the largest digital agencies in India, and was majority-acquired by the Fortune 500 Omnicom Group, via their global top-ten agency TBWA. In March 2014, Bajpai became CEO of the TBWA Group in India and led it until January 2016. He continues to lead Magnon Group in the capacity of Founder & CEO. In January 2016, he announced the launch of his second company, Talentrack. Talentrack is an online and mobile hiring-platform for artists and recruiters from the media and entertainment sector. The company also hosts Talentrack awards, which is an award pageant for the digital-entertainment ecosystem of India.

Writing 

Vineet Bajpai is a best-selling Indian author. His second book, The Street to the Highway, was published by Jaico in 2011. His third business cum motivational book, The 30 Something CEO, was published by Jaico in 2016. Bajpai's first fiction novel, Harappa: Curse of the Blood River, was released in June 2017. His second fiction book, the sequel to his first, was Pralay: The Great Deluge. It was released in January 2018. The last book in this trilogy series was Kashi: Secret of the Black Temple was released in November 2018. In November 2019, he released another historical fiction Mastaan: The Fallen Patriot of Delhi. The second part of the Mastaan Trilogy, 1857: The Sword of Mastaan, was released in February 2021. Bajpai is a regular guest speaker at various literature festivals. In 2018 he was invited for three speaking sessions at the Jaipur Literature Festival. He also spoke at the Chandigarh Literary Society and the Kala Ghoda Arts Festival.

Awards and recognition 

Bajpai won the Asia Pacific Entrepreneurship Award in 2011. In 2012, he won the CNBC TV Mercedes Benz Young Turks Award. In 2015 the Impact (Business World) magazine listed him among the 100 most influential people in India's digital ecosystem. He also won the Entrepreneur of the Year Award in 2016, bestowed to him by the Entrepreneur magazine. Bajpai is also a brand ambassador for Amazon Kindle Direct.

On 15 February 2019, Reliance Entertainment announced that it had acquired the film, web-series, gaming and merchandise rights of Vineet Bajpai’s Harappa Trilogy.

References 

Living people
People from Bareilly
Indian company founders
Delhi University alumni
Year of birth missing (living people)